The 2009 Indian general election in Arunachal Pradesh were held for 2 seats. Indian National Congress won both the seats.

Results

List of Elected MPs

See also
 Results of the 2009 Indian general election by state

References

Indian general elections in Arunachal Pradesh
2000s in Arunachal Pradesh
Arunachal